Indians in Luxembourg form a small minority in the country. As of 2007, there are about 300 people of Indian origin living in Luxembourg.

Migration history
Since the 1980s, Indians have been coming to Luxembourg due to the growth of the IT industry in the country and the fact that the Indian company ArcelorMittal has its head office there. Today, there are about 1000 Indian families living in the Grand Duchy. Most of the Indians in Luxembourg today are working in the financial sector or are into hotel management.

Language and religion
Indians in Luxembourg speak Indian languages such as Hindi, Punjabi, Tamil and Telugu as well as local languages like German, French and Luxembourgish. Christianity, Hinduism, Islam and Sikhism are practiced by the Indian community and festivals such as Christmas, Diwali and Eid are celebrated.

Organizations
1) The Indian Association of Luxembourg (IAL) was formed in 1991 by a businessman, Ambi Venkataraman. The association was born with the help of 13 founding members and it also serves an educational role in ensuring that children with Indian heritage understand their cultural history, including the religious festivals. In November 2011, the Indian Association of Luxembourg celebrated its 20th anniversary.

2) Considering majority of Tamil of speaking population among Indians in Luxembourg, former board members of IAL, founded Tamil Sangam Luxembourg (TSL – http://www.tamilsangam.lu) in 2017 to further extend support growing community in Luxembourg. TSL is hosting several cultural events (Diwali, Pongal, Tamil New year etc.) on yearly basis. TSL conducts regular weekly classes for Bharatha Natyam (Classical Indian dance), Tamil Language, Yoga  & state of art Kids focussed coding training. TSL has a membership base of around 200 families and strives to cherish our roots & traditions of Mother India and taking it to next generation of our kids.

Notable people
 Niharica Raizada, actress
 Ranga Yogeshwar, physicist

References

Ethnic groups in Luxembourg
Luxembourg
Luxembourg
Luxembourgian people of Indian descent